There was an alleged UFO incident on Ilkley Moor on 1 December 1987. A retired police officer claimed that he was abducted by aliens while on a morning walk and briefly held on their craft before being returned to the moor. The man took a photograph of the moor which he said shows one of the aliens that abducted him.

The photograph subsequently became a news story in the UK. It has been cited as one of the strongest pieces of evidence that we have that extra-terrestrials have visited Earth. It has also been described as “incredibly blurry”. Skeptics have dismissed the incident as a hoax, saying that the photograph shows something else, such as a man or a cardboard cut-out.

Background
Ilkley Moor is an area of moorland between Ilkley and Keighley in West Yorkshire, England. It is well-known as the inspiration for the song On Ilkla Moor Baht 'at. It is also known for its carved rocks, particularly the Swastika Stone. There have been many UFO sightings on the moor. Sceptics have suggested that this is because of the nearby proximity of Menwith Hill airforce base and Leeds Bradford Airport.

Philip Spencer (a pseudonym) had moved from London to remote West Yorkshire with his wife and child in order to be closer to his wife’s family following his retirement from the police force. On the morning of 1 December 1987 Spencer began walking across Ilkley Moor to visit his father-in-law in East Morton. He had taken a camera with him as well as a compass, in case there was fog.

Incident
According to Spencer, he was walking up a small hill when he noticed an odd-looking figure just up the trail ahead of him. It was dark green and about four feet tall with an oversized head and long, thin arms. The creature made a gesture at Spencer, which he took to be a gesture telling him to stay away, but he took out his camera and took a picture of it. The creature then ran away and Spencer followed it. He lost the creature in the fog but then saw a craft rise from the moor and disappear into the sky. He described the craft as being of a whitish colour and consisted of two saucer shaped parts that were attached, with one being on top of the other. There was also a loud hum. He did not take a photograph of the craft.

Rather than continue with his planned route, Spencer headed to another town that was about a half hour away. When he arrived he discovered that it was about two hours later in the day than he expected it to be. Additionally, the compass that he had taken with him was pointed in the opposite direction than it should have.

Initial aftermath
In the days following the alleged incident Spencer made contact with UFO researchers Jenny Randles and Peter Hough. Hough claimed to have been “extremely sceptical” at first but later came to believe Spencer. Spencer handed over the copyright of the photo to Hough. Although the story quickly made the news Spencer insisted on keeping his anonymity. Various write-ups of the case have made it clear that Spencer did not make any money from the story.

As well as examining the site, Hough sent the photograph to a number of experts. A wildlife photographer who examined the photograph said that it was not from any known animal. Experts from the Kodak laboratory in Hemel Hempstead said that they could not detect any evidence of tampering. Bruce Maccabee a US Navy optics expert and ufologist concluded that the photograph was “too grainy for proper testing”.

According to ufologist Nick Redfern, Spencer was hassled by the Ministry of Defence a few days after the incident on the moor. He says that they opened a file on Spencer and sent two Men in black to his home to intimidate him into silence.

Account changed under hypnosis
While the photograph was being examined Spencer claimed that he experienced strange dreams. Following Hough’s advice he attended a session of regressive hypnotherapy. This was carried out by Jim Singleton on 16 March 1988. Under hypnosis Spencer’s original account of the incident changed. Singleton has called it a “genuine recall”.

Spencer now recalled that upon seeing the creature on the hill he was instantly paralysed. He was then lifted up a few feet and pulled into the craft. When he entered the craft a voice told him to be calm. A group of green aliens then performed medical experiments on him, inserting items into his nose and mouth. He was given a tour of the craft  and shown a film. The film showed apocalyptic imagery, including nuclear explosions, famines and floods. Spencer was then shown a second film. He has never revealed the contents of the second film, saying that the aliens who abducted him do not want humanity to know.

Following this Spencer was returned to Ilkley Moor, where he then took the famous photograph. He claimed that the alien was actually waving goodbye to him, not telling him to stay away, as in his original account.

Legacy
The Ilkley Moor incident generated headlines in the UK at the time and remains one of the country’s most famous UFO sightings. Nick Pope, a journalist who previously worked at the ‘UFO desk’ of the Ministry of Defence included this event in a 2011 list of "Top 10 UFO incidents in the UK". It has been cited as one of the most persuasive UFO incidents to ever occur.

Skeptics have claimed that the whole incident is a hoax. They have said that the photograph is so blurry that it is far from proof of any alien visitors to Earth. They have argued that the “alien” in the photograph could easily be a man or a cardboard cut-out. Sceptics have also asked why Spencer did not take a photograph of the craft, noting that such a photograph would be more difficult to fake. Sceptics have also dismissed the supposed physical evidence of the broken compass, saying that it is easy to manually wreck compasses.

See also
 UFO sightings in the United Kingdom

References

1987 in England
History of West Yorkshire
Ilkley
UFO sightings in England
Yorkshire folklore
Alien abduction reports